Intellectual movements in Iran involve the Iranian experience of modernity and its associated art, science, literature, poetry, and political structures that have been changing since the 19th century.

History of Iranian modernity 
Long before the European Renaissance generated the radical ideas that eventually reshaped Europe and the United States, Persian statesmen, artists, and intellectuals had formulated ideas that strikingly anticipate those of modernity. Since more than thousand years ago there has been a conflict in Persia between the search for modernity and the forces of religious obscurantism.

Some twenty-five hundred years ago, when Herodotus was writing his Histories, Persia was the West's ultimate other.

It has been a common belief of scholars that modernity began in the West and is by its philosophical nature, economic underpinning, and cultural exigencies a uniquely western phenomenon. All other cultures, those who have lived on the darker side of Renaissance must emulate the Western experience, if they want to be modern. From Max Weber to Milan Kundera, many Western scholars and writers have argued that everything from representative democracy and rational thought to the art of the novel and the essay are not only western in origin but also uniquely suited to its culture, and native to its temperature climes.

Persia with its impressively rich and varied cultural legacy had a formative role in shaping Western consciousness. The Bible is replete with profuse praise for Persia and its kings. The Bible's praise for Cyrus the Great was partially in recognition of his role in freeing the Jews from their Babylonian captivity; of equal importance was the fact that the vast Persian empire of the time was a paragon of religious and cultural tolerance.

Hegel whose writings are considered by many as the apex of the Western philosophical tradition, uses superlatives in praising the role of Persia and Zarathustra in history.

Following Hegel in 19th-century Germany, Nietzsche wrote his magnum opus, Thus Spoke Zarathustra that similarly touched upon this key figure of the Persian imagination. Nietzsche's book offers a radical critique, almost a total debunking, of the whole Western tradition of philosophy. It is no mere accident that Nietzsche chose to articulate his critical views in the name of Zarathustra. The end of the 19th century was not the only or the last time Zarathustra played a prominent role in shaping Western consciousness and philosophic discourse. In 1990s Persian influences on the millennial fever, and on other New Age themes, were so strong that Harold Bloom, the eminent American critic, suggested that the last decade of the twentieth century should in truth be called "a return to Zoroastrian origins."

Western art, no less than history and theology, bear testimony to the ubiquity of the Persian presence in antiquity. Of all the extant works of Greek tragedy, for example, the only one that is about a non-Greek subject is Aeschylus' play The Persians.

Generations of Iranian intellectuals

First generation

The nineteenth century Persian reformers who are considered as the first generation of Iranian intellectuals were perfectly conscious of the fact that it was not enough to rely upon the antiquity of Persian civilization to think about its continued ability to survive. They tried to establish a relationship with men of power that would have permitted them to dictate their blueprints for reforms. These blueprints naturally remained without immediate impact among the men of power to whom they were addressed. These intellectual reforms encountered a widespread opposition from the court and the Ulama. Abd al-Rahim Talebof, Fath-'Ali Akhoundzadeh, and Sani o Doleh belong to this generation.

Second generation
The second generation intended to introduce modern civilization to Persia, not only by imitating the West, but through a coherent and systematic approach to European culture. Mohammad-Taqi Bahar, Ali Dashti, Ali Akbar Davar, Mohammad-Ali Foroughi, Sadeq Hedayat, Bozorg Alavi, Ahmad Kasravi, Saeed Nafisi, Hasan Taqizadeh, Abdolhossein Teymourtash and `Abdu'l-Bahá belong to this generation.

Third generation

The third generation of Iranian intellectuals signify the absorption of Russian Marxism into Iranian political and social thought. With the popularity of Marxist ideology among the third generation of Iranian intellectuals, the new culture for translation and knowledge of modernity was drawn inevitably toward moral and political absolutes. Intellectuals claimed to be "givers of lessons" and acted as "moral legislators" who were critics of both the state and the society. Jalal Al-e-Ahmad and well known intellectual and social theorist Ali Shariati belong to this generation.

Fourth generation
Fourth generation of Iranian intellectuals are mainly characterized by the journals such as Goftegu and Kiyan. In contrast with the ideological generation of Iranian intellectuals who in their encounter with the western modernity favoured a monistic attitude exemplified by Marxist and Heideggerian philosophies, the Fourth Generation of Iranian intellectuals decided on a move away and a critical distanciation from master ideologies.
The methodological position of the new generation of Iranian intellectuals is characterized by two main philosophical attitudes: the extension of an anti-utopian thinking on an intersubjective basis on the one hand, and the urge for a non-imitative dialogical exchange with the modern values of the West on the other.
Abdolkarim Soroush among many others belong to the fourth generation.

Modern art movement 

Iranian experience and development of modernity led to a unique style of cinema, painting and music. Iranian New wave, a movement in Iranian cinema, has found worldwide reputation due to its deeply Philosophical, poetic and artistic style. Abbas Kiarostami is the most notable figure in the New wave of Iranian cinema. In the artistic and aesthetic realm, features of New wave of Persian cinema, for example the works of Abbas Kiarostami, can be classified as postmodern.

In his book Close Up: Iranian Cinema, Past, Present, Future (2001) Hamid Dabashi describes modern Iranian cinema and the phenomenon of [Iranian] national cinema as a form of cultural modernity. According to Dabashi, "the visual possibility of seeing the historical person (as opposed to the eternal Qur'anic man) on screen is arguably the single most important event allowing Iranians access to modernity."

Mehdi Saeedi, is an internationally renowned artist and designer. His aesthetics have become a mainstay of design in many regions, especially in those using the Arabic script as their alphabet. And on November (2009) he won Grand Price for the Five Star Designers at International Invitational Poster Triennial in Osaka, Japan.

On 13 December 2006, graphic designer, Reza Abedini, received the Principal Award in the Prince Claus Awards for his way of applying the knowledge and accomplishments of Iran's artistic heritage, renewing them, and making them exciting again. Reza Abedini's Persian Sym style unites the rich calligraphic tradition of Persian culture with "modernity".

It is believed that Ebrahim Golestan, Fereydoun Rahnema and Farrokh Ghaffari founded Iran's "different" cinematic style and Iranian intellectual movement in the 20th century.

Marcos Grigorian and Hossein Zenderoudi were pioneers of Iranian modern painting and Sculpture.

Modern and contemporary architecture movement
Although the new era in Iranian architecture began with the rise of Safavid dynasty, (1501 - 1736), in fact, it is in the early decades of the twentieth century that the first generation of modern Iranian architects, almost like every generation of modern architects in the world, appears as being influenced by the Modern Movement and rationalism in architecture. Architects such as Vartan Hovanessian, Ali Sadegh, Mohsen Foroughi, Paul Akbar, Gabriel Guevrekian, Heydar Ghiai, Abdolaziz Farmanfarmaian and Hooshang Seyhoun are examples of this movement.

Later, in the mid-1960s, Ali Sardar Afkhami, Kamran Diba and Nader Ardalan are among those Iranian architects who have opened their design approach to the history and traditions to represent a trend of Iranian Post-Modernism.

Attention for the new trends in international architecture, is being carried out by Iranian architects, even after the Islamic Revolution.

In this context, It is of interest the attempt by some architects like Abbas Gharib or Bahram Shirdel to go in deep within the most advanced theory and trends in contemporary and Post-contemporary architecture, such as the theory of Complex systems in architecture in the case of Gharib and folding theory in the case of Shirdel. These experiments are valid methods and contribution to liberate architecture and design, from abstraction, flatness, stiffness, forced rectangular and Heterotopia of the modernist spaces for a more fluid, flexible, soft and dynamic architecture, open to the complexities of its environment and context

Music movement
Simultaneous with the constitutional revolution in Iran, young musicians sought new forms of music to synchronize with the tide of social changes. In 1937, Tehran's Symphonic Orchestra started working and performing western as well as Iranian music.

The 1979 revolution launched a renaissance in Persian classical music. The emergence of three ensembles, the Aref Ensemble, the Sheyda Ensemble and the Masters of Persian Music revolutionized Iranian music during the late 20th century and at the turn of the millennium.

New figures emerged in Persian Symphonic Music, and several symphony orchestras started their work despite a lack of support from national governments or international bodies. The new wave can be characterized by growing interest in using both Iranian and European instruments and musical genres. Perhaps the best examples are the Melal Orchestra and the National Iranian Symphony Orchestra.

Folk music also enjoyed the emergence of figures such as Sima Bina and Kamkar. These musicians introduced Iranian folk music (Khorasani, Kurdish, Bandari, Mazandarani music, among others) to the international community by organizing numerous concerts worldwide.

Letters 

Literary criticism and comparative literature in Iran entered a new phase in the 19th century. Persian literature enjoyed the emergence of influential figures as Sadeq Hedayat, Ahmad Kasravi, Abdolhossein Zarrinkoub, Shahrokh Meskoob, Ebrahim Golestan and Sadegh Choubak.

Poetry after classics 

Modern Persian poetry came into existence after Nima Yushij. Some notable figures include:
 Nima Yushij
 Bijan Jalali
 Fereydoon Moshiri
 Forough Farrokhzad
 Manouchehr Atashi
 Mehdi Akhavan-Sales
 Hushang Ebtehaj
 Ahmad Shamlou
 Mohammad Ali Sepanloo
 Mohammad Reza Shafiei-Kadkani
 Mohammad Zohari
 Simin Behbahani
 Sohrab Sepehri

Drama 

After the translation of Mirza Fatali Akhundov's plays into Persian in the 19th century, Persian drama came into a new period. 20th century saw the appearance of great playwrights such as Bahram Beyzai and Akbar Radi.

Modern scientific movement

The history of modern science in Iran dates back to the year 1851 and the establishment of Darolfonoon – which was founded as a result of the efforts of Mirza Taghi Khan Amir Kabir, aiming at training and teaching Iranian experts on many fields of sciences, and it was the future minded Abbas Mirza who first dispatched students to Europe to obtain a western education.

By the establishment of Tehran University, science in Iran entered a new phase. Mahmoud Hessaby, Ali-Asghar Hekmat, Moslem Bahadori and many others played roles in initiating and forming these movements. The outcome of the movement has been the emergence of researchers who have been trained and received doctorate degrees in the country and have found international reputations.
Modernization of Iranian medicine did not occur through the straightforward replacement of traditional Persian medicine by modern European medicine. Rather, the integration of modern medicine went through a long process that included both the reinterpretation of traditional theories by traditional physicians and the assimilation of modern theories through the prism of traditional medicine.

One of the main Iranian scientific movements in the late 20th century was in the field of chemistry and pharmaceutical chemistry. The main leaders of this movement were Abbas Shafiee, Bijan Farzami, Mohammad-Nabi Sarbolouki, Issa Yavari and Ahmad Reza Dehpour. The movement resulted in hundreds of research papers in peer reviewed international journals.

Other notable figures who promoted world-class research in Iran during the 20th century are
Reza Mansouri and Yousof Sobouti (Physics)
Abolhassan Farhoudi (Immunology)
Mohammad Reza Zarrindast (Pharmacology)
Fereydoun Davatchi (Rheumatology)
Taher Movassaghian (Chemistry)
Ardeshir Ghavamzadeh (Hematology)
Ali Radmehr (Radiology)
Hossein Najmabadi (Medical genetics)
Hormoz Shams (Ophthalmology)
Moslem Bahadori (Pathology)
Hormoz Dabirashrafi (Obstetrics and Gynecology)
Hossein Esteky (Neuroscience)
G.R. Baradaran Khosroshahi (Mathematics)
Caro Lucas (Electrical Engg., AI)
Jawad Salehi (Electrical Engg.)
Ali Kaveh (Civil Engg.)

Iran's university population has swelled from 100,000 in 1979 to 2 million in 2006. Indeed, in Iran some 70% of science and engineering students are women.

Iran is now a world leader in some areas like string theory. When a reporter for Nature asked Reza Mansouri: "Why do I see so many string theory papers coming out of Iran?" He explained how Iranian scientists worked together under revolution, sanctions and war to bring Iran to such a position: "I remember exactly the beginning of the revolution, some old colleagues just sat together and spoke about what we could do for Iran. Is it understood that we have to look for excellence, in some areas that we may be strong and that we may get strong at that so that will be the field of physics. So we began with that. It happens that the most active field physicists in our country were working on the string theory at that time. So they tried to be of a school, so to speak, and we did know that that was the only way which was somehow independent of all these political fluctuations regarding war, regarding cultural revolution, all that, and we really tried hard to build up schools. So we have it now, string schools, so to say somehow."

In 2007 United Nations awarded Hossein Malek-Afzali with the prestigious UN Population Award. Malek Afzali has helped design strategies to improve health procedures, particularly adolescent health, reproductive health and family planning. In the field of reproductive health, he has engaged policymakers and religious leaders in the planning and implementation of reproductive health programmes in Iran.

Iranian women's movement 

Currently women's rights groups are among the most active social rights groups in Iran and are mostly involved in an effort to gain equal rights for women in the Iranian legal system by opposing specific discriminatory laws. However, under the Presidential regime of Mahmoud Ahmadinejad, elected president in 2005, women's rights advocates have been beaten, jailed and persecuted.

The presence of women in Iranian intellectual movements (science, modern literature, cinema, human-rights activism, etc.) has been remarkable throughout the history of modern Iran. According to the research ministry of Iran, women accounted for 56% of all university students in the natural sciences, including one in five Ph.D. students. Such education and social trends are increasingly viewed with alarm by the Iranian government.

In cinema and the visual arts, Shirin Neshat, Tahmineh Milani, Rakhshan Bani Etemad, and Samira Makhmalbaf created new cinematic styles which have attracted many from all over the world and in international festivals. Persian poet and literary figure Simin Behbahani was nominated for 1997 Nobel Prize for literature. The 2003 Nobel Peace Prize went to Shirin Ebadi for her efforts for democracy and human rights, especially for the rights of women and children. Simin Daneshvar's Savushun is a novel about the Iranian experience of modernity during the 20th century.

Iranian writer and satirist, Bibi Khatoon Astarabadi was perhaps the first professional female satirist, critic and one of the notable figures involved in Persian constitutional revolution.
In the early 20th century, Persian music enjoyed the emergence of Qamar ol-Molouk Vaziri, the "Lady of Iranian music".

Historical landmarks

Persian constitutional revolution
Iran had undergone a phenomenal constitutional revolution at the turn of the twentieth century. The constitutional movement was concerned with modernity and human rights. It led to the establishment of a parliament in Iran. Mirza Jahangir-Khan Shirazi and Farrokhi Yazdi were among the most notable writers and critics of this era who sacrificed their lives for establishment of democracy and freedom in Iran.

28 Mordad coup
In the 1953 Iranian coup d'état, known in Iran as the 28 Mordad coup, the Prime Minister of Iran Mohammad Mosaddegh was overthrown on 19 August 1953. The coup d'état was orchestrated by the United Kingdom (under the name 'Operation Boot') and the United States (under the name TPAJAX Project).

Mossadegh had sought to reduce the semi-absolute role of the Shah granted by the Constitution of 1906, thus making Iran a full democracy, and to nationalize the Iranian oil industry, consisting of vast oil reserves and the Abadan Refinery, both owned by the Anglo-Iranian Oil Company, a British corporation (now BP).
A military government under General Fazlollah Zahedi was formed which allowed Mohammad-Rezā Shāh Pahlavi, the Shah of Iran (Persian for an Iranian king), to effectively rule the country as an absolute monarch according to the constitution. He relied heavily on United States support to hold on to power until his own overthrow in February 1979.

In August 2013 the Central Intelligence Agency (CIA) admitted that it was involved in both the planning and the execution of the coup, including the bribing of Iranian politicians, security and army high-ranking officials, as well as pro-coup propaganda. The CIA is quoted acknowledging the coup was carried out "under CIA direction" and "as an act of U.S. foreign policy, conceived and approved at the highest levels of government."

Iranian Revolution 
Some researchers believe that the Iranian Revolution was not a simple clash between modernity and tradition but an attempt to accommodate modernity within a sense of authentic Islamic identity, culture and historical experience.

Perceived by many as a revolt against the secular modernity of the West, Iranian revolution was welcomed by some Western thinkers as a triumph of spiritual values over the profane world of capitalist materialism. For others the Iranian revolution was a protest against the very political rationality of the modern era.

2nd of Khordad movement 

The election of the former President Mohammad Khatami in May 1997 was through the emergence of a new political force, the youth. Inspired by simultaneously individualist and democratic ideals that are incompatible in every respect with the authoritarian values and symbols traditionally associated in the Iranian intellectual arena with Marxist and Heideggerian World views. It is in this new social atmosphere that the emergence of a global community or a cyberpolis was able to reveal to the Iranian youth the true nature of instrumental rationality as modern universal standards. Saeed Hajjarian was widely believed to be the main strategist behind the 1997 reform movement of Iran. He allegedly showed the supremacy of politics as such over any religious norm when he said that the survival of the Islamic Republic was paramount and that no religious ritual should stand in its way. This kind of decision, he states, means that politics are more important than religion and that this acknowledges the secularization of religion. In this context, he argues, it is possible to reassess velayat faqih and to reject its supremacy within the political field in Iran. While calling to build a new reform movement, Hajjarian believes that the reform movement started in 1997, died during Khatami's second term. He believes that the reform project started by Persian constitutional revolution, has not been completed yet.(ref: Farhad Khosrokhavar, The New Intellectuals in Iran, Social Compass, Vol. 51, No. 2, 191-202 (2004))

The scope of 2nd of Khordad movement was much broader than President Khatami's reform plan. The latter has been criticised for wanting slow progress and not producing a real democratic alternative for the current Islamic republic. When asked about this during Khatami's visit to United Kingdom, he said "You know for centuries we have been under dictatorship so we cannot get to a democracy all of a sudden, we have to go step by step"

Campaigns against intellectuals 
After the Iranian Revolution, the Cultural Revolution and the Chain murders of Iran were two major campaigns that involved the imprisonment, torture, emigration, and massacre of Iranian scholars.

Intellectual circles in late 20th century
Intellectual circles in postrevolutionary Iran can be classified into the following categories:

Revolutionary intellectual circles 
The main figures in this category are Ali Shariati, Jalal Al Ahmad and Morteza Motahhari. Morteza Motahhari was the main theorist and thinker behind Iranian revolution. He is considered to be one of the most influential philosophical leaders of pre-revolutionary Iran and the impact and popularity of his thought continues to be felt throughout Iranian society many years later.

Reformist intellectual circles 

Main figures in this category are Mehdi Bazargan, Abdolkarim Soroush, Mohammad Mojtahed Shabestari, Mostafa Malekian, Mohsen Kadivar, Alireza Alavitabar and Hossein Bashiriyeh.

The unifying traits of these intellectuals include their recognition of reform in the Islamic thought, democracy, civil society and religious pluralism and their opposition to the absolute supremacy of the Faqih. The rise of religious intellectuals can be followed through the writings of Abdolkarim Soroosh. Soroosh's main idea is that there are perennial unchanging religious truths, but our understanding of them remains contingent on our knowledge in the fields of science and philosophy. Unlike Ali Shariati, who turned to Marxism to bring a historicist perspective to the Shiite thought, Soroosh debates the relation between democracy and religion and discusses the possibility of what he calls religious democracy.

Influenced by Persian mysticism, Soroush advocated a type of reformist Islam that went beyond most liberal Muslim thinkers of the 20th century and argued that the search for reconciliation of Islam and democracy was not a matter of simply finding appropriate phrases in the Qur'an that were in agreement with modern science, democracy, or human rights. Drawing on the works of Molana Jalaleddin Balkhi, Immanuel Kant, G.W.F. Hegel, Karl Popper, and Erich Fromm, Soroush called for a reexamination of all tenets of Islam, insisting on the need to maintain the religion's original spirit of social justice and its emphasis on caring for other people.

Other influential figures in these circles are Saeed Hajjarian, Ahmad Sadri, Mahmoud Sadri, Ezzatollah Sahabi, Ahmad Ghabel and Hassan Yousefi Eshkevari. Akbar Ganji had also been associated with this circle before he published his Manifest of Republicanism. Moreover, Akbar Ganji took a tour around the world in order to invite non Iranian intellectuals to join Iran's intellectual movement. Many Persian scholars believe that such interactions with world scholars would promote Iranian intellectualism and democratic reform. Richard Rorty, Noam Chomsky, Anthony Giddens, David Hild, Shmuel Noah Eisenstadt among a few others accepted the honorary membership of Iranian intellectual society.

Perhaps the most important achievement of this circle was training a new generation of Iranian intellectuals who are far ahead of their mentors and do not belong to any of well-established intellectual circles in Iran. Ahmad Zeidabadi and Mehdi Jami belong to this new generation of Persian scholars.

Democratic religious circles (In-system reformers)
These groups are characterized by the followings:
Support for Islamic republic as the best form of government
Calling for Religious tolerance
Calling for democratic values
Rejecting liberalism
Rejecting secularism
Calling for the rule of law and civil society
They believe that ethics has priority over politics.

The main thinker and theorist of this circle is Mohammad Khatami, former president of Iran. Other notable figures include Yousef Sanei, Abdollah Noori, Mir Hossein Mousavi and Mostafa Moin. They are mainly under the influence of ideas of Ayatollah Mirza Hossein Na'eeni and Ayatollah Ruhollah Khomeini.

Neo-conservative intellectual circles 
Unlike the reformist intellectuals, the neo- conservative intellectuals in Iran are in favor of the supremacy of the Leader and against concepts such as democracy, civil society and pluralism. This movement includes figures such as Reza Davari Ardakani, Javad Larijani and Mehdi Golshani. The famous personality among these is Reza Davari Ardakani, who as an anti- Western philosopher is very familiar with the works of Martin Heidegger. Davari, unlike Soroosh, takes some of the features of Heidegger's thought, mainly the critic of modernity and puts it into an Islamic wording. He rejects the Western model of democracy, which is based on the separation of politics and religion.

Non-religious intellectual circles 
Main figures in this category are Javad Tabatabaei, Dariush Shayegan, Amir Hossein Aryanpour, Ramin Jahanbegloo, Ehsan Naraghi, Khosro Naghed, Abbas Milani, and Aramesh Doustdar.

Javad Tabtabaei deplores the deep roots of religion in the Iranian culture. For Tabatabai, the decline of the Iranian political thought goes back to the 9th and 10th centuries and, since then, it has been impossible for them to adequately understand the modernity. The social sciences, according to him, have been introduced in Iran without the secularization of thought and its rationalization and therefore, they reproduce in an unconscious way the ancient prejudices and the inability to think adequately.

Dariush Shayegan criticizes a view of religion that does not take into account the major trends of the modern world where cultural homogeneity and religious absolutism are questioned. The quest for a holistic identity based on a monolithic view of Islam is alien to the evolution of modern world and means the isolation and regression of the (Iranian) society.

Dariush Shayegan, who writes mainly in French (but has been extensively translated into Persian), shares some of the views of these particular intellectuals, but his major contribution is to invite Iranians to accept the ‘‘fragmented identity’’ of the modern world and to renounce a unitary view of the Self which leads to a fascination with utopian and mythological ideologies. He insists that, since Iran has undergone the change directly from tradition to postmodernity without the mediation of modernity, it is experiencing a strong malaise. His solution is to open up Iran to the new multicultural world in which one has to accept the diversity of the perspectives and, therefore, to be tolerant towards others who do not think and behave in the same way as the Self. This invitation to become open-minded and to give up the idea of a homogeneous culture exerts an undeniable influence on many young people in Iran.

Traditional scholars 
The most notable circle was associated with Hossein Nasr, founder of Imperial Iranian Academy of Philosophy. For Nasr, the traditional world was pervaded by a tremendous sense of the Sacred and the Absolute, whereas the inception of modernity involved precisely the severing off of that awareness, resulting in what Max Weber would later dub the disenchantment of the world.
Nasr has been an unrelenting opponent of Islamic fundamentalism in all its forms throughout his career because he sees it as a somewhat vigilante reactionary movement operating within the paradigm of the modern nation state, but even more so, because it lacks a well thought out metaphysical basis rooted in a traditional Muslim understanding of the world which respects both nature and human dignity.

Other notable figures 

There are several intellectual figures who continue to be very influential in Iranian society, while they do not belong to any of the above-mentioned philosophical circles:

Scholars:
Yadollah Sahabi, prominent academic, writer and scientist
Mohammad Gharib, pioneering physician and academic
Fereydoun Hoveyda (prominent scholar, writer and filmmaker)
Daryoush Ashouri (prominent scholar, linguist and cultural theorist)
Masoud Behnoud (prominent journalist and writer)
Parviz Varjavand (scholar, archeologist and expert of cultural heritage)
Farrokhroo Parsa (scholar, politician and physician; first female minister of Iran)

Economists:
Mousa Ghaninejad (senior Iranian economist)
Fariborz Rais-Dana (senior economist)

Experts on law and political sciences:
Davoud Hermidas-Bavand (prominent scholar and political scientist)
Nasser Katouzian (Tehran University professor of law and political sciences)
Jamshid Momtaz (Tehran University professor of international law)
Javad Zarif (prominent scholar, political analyst and expert on international relations)
Sadeq Zibakalam (leading political scientist and professor of Tehran University)
Amir Attaran lawyer and immunologist; expert on public health and global development issues.
Elaheh Koulaei (political scientist and expert on USSR at Tehran University)

Philosophy education in Iran 

Philosophy has become a popular subject of study during last few decades in Iran. Comparing the number of philosophy books currently published in Iran with that in other countries, Iran possibly ranks first in this field but it is definitely on top in terms of publishing philosophy books. Currently different approaches are working in a diverging fields of philosophy:
 1. Traditional Persian Islamic philosophy. traditional classic philosophy revived after a period of silence, in Tehran School, and notably works of Agha Ali Modarres Zonoozi in the early 20th century, after him both schools of Tehran and Ghom (with the works of Allameh Tabatabai and Imam Ruhollah Khomayni) activated philosophical debates. Nowaday, Islamic philosophy is the most fresh period all over the world in Iran all the way after Sfavid school of Isfahan. The most notable figures of our time include Allameh Hossein tabatabaii, Allameh Rafiai Gazvini, Mehdi Hayeri Yazdi, Falatouri, Hasan zadeh Amoli, Morteza Motahhari, Abolhasan Jelveh, Mohammad tagi Amoli, allameh hossein Gharavi Isfahani (kompani), Ibrahim Ashtiyani, Jalaloddin Ashtiyani, Kazem assar.
 2. Western philosophy. The Western philosophy is mostly welcome to Iran in the 19th century, but its full development began in the 1970s, with the reactive movement against the left political thought of Soviet sect of Toodeh party, most notably by refutation of their Marxist–Leninist works (typically in Tagi Arani's works). The leading figures include Allameh Tabatabai, and his pupil Morteza Motahhari. Also Ahmad Fardid and his Circle who introduced phenomenology and very specifically Martin Heidegger to Iranian Academia. His pupils like Reza Davari, Dariush Shayegan who are now among famous Iranian philosophers developed his way to interpret modern conditions in Iran. Today the most dominant branch of Western philosophy in Iranian academia is Continental philosophy; The domination of the department of philosophy of the University of Tehran over the teaching of philosophy with laying on Islamic philosophy and Continental philosophy put it ahead of philosophy education in Iran. Department of philosophy of the University of Tehran traditionally is the top place of the greatest philosophers in secular education system in Iran; among the philosophers of the University of Tehran to be named are Reza Davari, Ebrahimi Dinani, and Mahmoud Khatami whose influences are clear all over students of philosophy. Reza Davari who is a philosopher with great debates on Modern condition, intellectualism and enlightenment ranked as the leading Persian philosopher with anti-Western approach. His ideas challenge the defender of Western culture and notably the defender of analytical philosophy and scienticism. Dinani is a defender of Islamic philosophy who also talks about the west; Mahmoud Khatami, who is commonly considered as a phenomenologist, is ranked as a totally scholar with no political sign who teaches analytical and continental philosophies in the university, but he has developed a different philosophy of his own that is called [Ontetics]. However, analytical philosophy is also introduced in Iran in the 1970s by the translations from British Empiricism, and then, in 1980 to the present an increasing interest is in students of philosophy to learn more from this 20th-century branch of philosophy. Very specifically, analytic philosophy of science and social science, and moral philosophy introduced by Abdolkarim Soroush in the early 1980s, and followed by others. Philosophy of mind introduced to Iranian academia by Mahmoud Khatami, and philosophy of logic and philosophy of language introduced by Hamid Vahid Dastgerdi. Philosophy of religion is also most welcome branch with the Iranian scholars.
 3. Comparative philosophy is a tendency in Iranian scholarship.
 4. Traditionalist (sonnatgera)is also an approach introduced by Hossein Nasr.

See also 

 History of philosophy
 History of ideas
 Intellectual history
 Iranian modern and contemporary art
 Iranian philosophy
 Isfahan School
 Persian literature
 Religious intellectualism in Iran
 Science and technology in Iran

References

Sources
Latifiyan, Ali. Reviewing the Performance of Intellectuals from 1941 to 1979, (1995), Tehran: Imam Sadiq University
Abbas Milani, Lost Wisdom: Rethinking Modernity in Iran, Mage Publishers, (2004). .
The fourth generation of Iranian intellectuals, Ramin Jahanbegloo, (2000).
Secularism, national identity, and the role of the intellectual, by Ramin Jahanbegloo, (2005).
Ramin Jahanbegloo, Iranian intellectuals: from revolution to dissent
Farhad Khosrokhavar, The New Intellectuals in Iran, Social Compass, Vol. 51, No. 2, 191-202 (2004)
Afshin Matin-asgari, Iranian postmodernity: the rhetoric of irrationality?, Critique: Critical Middle Eastern Studies, Volume 13, Number 1 / Spring (2004).
Gheissari, Ali. Iranian Intellectuals in the 20th Century. Austin University of Texas Press, 1998.

External links 
Religious Intellectual and Political Action in the Reform Movement
The next chapter: Atypical conversations with Daryush Shayegan on the impact of ideology in contemporary Iranian history
Far Near Distance: Contemporary positions of Iranian artists
The great land of the Sophy: Persian influences
The Emergence and Development of Religious Intellectualism in Iran 
Sadeq Hedayat Centenary Symposium
Amir Hossein Aryanpour, A rational man
Coming to Terms with Modernity: Iranian intellectuals and the emerging public sphere
The reform movement and the debate on modernity and tradition in contemporary Iran
Abdolkarim Soroush; Iran's Democratic Voice Time magazine
Amir Hossein Aryanpour, Prominent Iranian intellectual
Iranian Intellectuals and the West: The Tormented Triumph of Nativism
Swedish scholar, Hans Rosling on Iranian experience of modernity 

Iranian culture
Persian philosophy
History of civil rights and liberties in Iran
Intellectualism